Hoseynabad (also Romanized as Ḩoseynābād; also known as Ḩoseynābād-e Sar Cheshmeh and Ḩoseynābād-e Shāmkān) is a village in Shamkan Rural District, Sheshtomad District, Sabzevar County, Razavi Khorasan Province, Iran. At the 2006 census, its population was 961, in 216 families.

References 

Populated places in Sabzevar County